Lockley is a surname. Notable people with the surname include:
 Andrew Lockley (born 1971), British special effects artist
 Kate Lockley, television character
 Martin Lockley, English paleontologist
 Michael Lockley, American football player
 Ronald Lockley, naturalist and author

See also
 Lockleys, a suburb of Adelaide, Australia